Leroy George Herrmann (February 27, 1906 – July 3, 1972), was an American professional baseball pitcher. He played in Major League Baseball for the Chicago Cubs and Cincinnati Reds between 1932 and 1935.

References

External links

1906 births
1972 deaths
Major League Baseball pitchers
Chicago Cubs players
Cincinnati Reds players
Baseball players from Illinois